Chittamuru Ramaiya (Telugu: చిట్టమూరు రామయ్య) was a 19th and 20th century Theosophist and translator, and an associate of Annie Besant. The son of Chittamuru Sriramulu, he had five brothers Chittamuru Subbaramaiah, Chittamuru Krishnaiah, Chittamuru Subbarayudu, Chittamuru Lakshmaiah and Chittamuru Ramachandraiah. He completed a degree in Bachelor of Arts in Literature in the 19th century. He was associated with Annie Besant for some time at the Theosophical Society, Adyar, Madras, India.

He wrote many books on theosophy, including one titled Divya jnana saaramu, meaning "The Essence of Theosophy"; a second edition of this title was published by C.Subbarayudu, Manager, Vasantha Institute, Madras, in 1937. The book included one chapter, "Adrushya sahayulu", from a book titled Divya jnana deepika by his brother Subbaramaiah. He published another book, Brahma vidya darpanamu ("Hinduism in Light of Theosophy"), in 1941; this he dedicated to Annie Besant. He was also known for having translated the book At the Feet of the Master, attributed to J. Krishnamurti, into Telugu. [Parama-gurucharana-sannidhi. A translation by Ramayya of " At the Feet of the Master."] 1911.

Theosophical Publishing House and Vasantha Institute, Adayar, Madras (Chennai), 

Below information is from Page 421 - Theosophist Magazine January 1931 to March 1931 

How an altruistic and willing man can find means of serving the world and doing good amidst most untoward circumstances is exemplified in the life of C. Ramaiya, our late Joint General Secretary of the T.S. for South India.

He was born in 1867 and dropped his body at Adayar on 18 January last. He had his College education at the Madras Christian College and qualified as a school master. After several posts he became Headmaster of the Municipal High School at Cuddapah. The school was started in 1857 as a part of Thomas Babington Macaulay initiatives in education. I made acquaintance in 1896, which grew into close friendship. He joined Theosophical Society in 1897 at Cuddapah.

From the way in which he began his membership of the T.S. we were very hopeful of seeing him become an important worker for the T.S.

Instead of indulging in ease after the strenuous school work of the day in the schools, he took a great interest in leading the study class of the T.S. lodge at Cuddapah. Endowed with keen intellect geniality he was very useful, with his knowledge of Chemistry & allied subjects in helping the T.S. members in their studies. He was of the old type of school masters who would prepare the previous night for the next days class lessons. In the enervating malarial climate of Cuddapah he diligently discharged his duties as school master as the member of T.S. and as citizen to boot.

He resigned the position as Headmaster in the Municipal High School at Cuddapah in 1913 to give services completely to T.S. work and he undertook to travel and visit the widely scattered T.S. lodges in S. India. At the time of his resignation as Head of the School, a Theosophical High School was started in neighboring town (Proddatur) and the president of T.S asked him to accept the position of Head of that Institution. He was next asked to go to Madanapalle Theosophical High School in a similar position. In all the places where he served as a schoolmaster his contemporaries as well as his students, had a uniform love and respect for him. The Inspecting Officers of the Department had a great regard and admiration for him.

In 1918 he took up the work of visiting T.S. Lodges and he came to live at Adayar. He travelled far and wide in South India in his new role and also accepted one responsible work after another and performed them all to the entire satisfaction of those who gave him the work. At the time of his death he held following positions:

1.	Assistant to C. Jinarajadasa

2.	Joint General Secretary of the T.S.in South India

3.	Secretary of Vasanta Institute

4.	Secretary of Bharata Samaja

5.	Editor of Bharata Dharma

6.	Editor of Divyajnana-Dipika and

7.	Manager for sometime of Dharmajyoti

He did all the work though his health was poor and suffering from diabetes.

He leaves an open place in Adayar and it is not easy to fill this satisfactorily. He devotion to the Great Ones and Their representatives was unshakable and sincere.

By, A. K. Sitarama Shastry

References

1867 births
1931 deaths
Indian Theosophists